The men's 100 metre backstroke heats and semifinals at the 2010 Youth Olympic Games took place on August 15 and the final took place on August 16 at the Singapore Sports School.

Medalists

Heats

Heat 1

Heat 2

Heat 3

Heat 4

Semifinal

Semifinal 1

Semifinal 2

Final

References
 Heat Results
 Semifinals Results
 Final Result

Swimming at the 2010 Summer Youth Olympics